Acraea acara, commonly known as the acara acraea, is a butterfly of the family Nymphalidae which is native to East and southern Africa.

Description
See Acraea zetes for diagnosis The wingspan is 55–66 mm for males and 60–72 mm for females.

Range and habitat
It is found in South Africa, Mozambique, Zimbabwe, Zambia, Katanga in the southern DRC, Malawi, Tanzania, and eastern Kenya. In South Africa its range has expanded southwards since 2014, becoming more widespread in the Eastern Cape. The habitat consists of forests and woodland.

Subspecies
There are two subspecies:
Acraea acara acara – eastern Kenya, Tanzania, DRC: Shaba, Malawi, Zambia, Mozambique, Zimbabwe, Botswana, Namibia, Eswatini, South Africa: Limpopo, Mpumalanga, North West, KwaZulu-Natal, Eastern Cape
Acraea acara melanophanes Le Cerf, 1927 – northern Namibia

Taxonomy
It is a member of the Acraea zetes species group-   but see also Pierre & Bernaud, 2014

References

External links

Images at BOLD

acara
Butterflies described in 1865
Butterflies of Africa
Taxa named by William Chapman Hewitson